The 2019 Big West Conference men's volleyball tournament was a postseason men's volleyball tournament for the Big West Conference during the 2019 NCAA Division I & II men's volleyball season. It was held from April 18 through April 20, 2019 at University of Hawaii's Stan Sheriff Center. The winner received the conference's automatic bid to the 2019 NCAA Volleyball Tournament.

Seeds
All six teams were eligible for the postseason, with the top two seeds receiving byes to the semifinals. Teams were seeded by record within the conference, with a tiebreaker system to seed teams with identical conference records.

Schedule and results

Bracket

Hawai'i won the 2019 Big West Conference men's volleyball tournament. The title is their first Big West men's volleyball title.

References

Big West Conference Men's Volleyball Tournament
Tournament
Big West Conference men's volleyball tournament
Big West Conference men's volleyball tournament
Big West Conference men's volleyball tournament